7 for All Mankind
 Aéropostale (clothing)
 Angels Jeanswear
 Arizona Jean Co.
 Big John
 Brittania Sportswear Ltd
 Brutus Jeans
 Buck Mason
 Bugle Boy
 Calvin Klein (fashion house)
 Chip and Pepper
 Devergo
 Dickies
 Diesel (brand)
 DL1961
 Donna Ida
 Edwin (company)
 Evisu
 Fiorucci
 Gap Inc.
 Gas Jeans
 Great Western Garment Co.
 Guess (clothing)
 House of Deréon
 ISKO (clothing company)
 JNCO
 Jordache
 Just Group
 L.E.I.
 Lee (jeans)
 Lee Cooper
 Levi Strauss & Co.
 London Denim
 Lucky Brand Jeans
 Marithé et François Girbaud
 Mavi Jeans
 Mih jeans
 Miss Sixty
 Mossimo
 MUD Jeans
 Mudd Jeans
 Noko Jeans
 Nudie Jeans
 Outland Denim
 Pepe Jeans
 Prps
 Billy Reid (fashion designer)
 Rock & Republic
 Sergio Valente
 Silver Jeans Co.
 Superdry
 Texas Jeans USA
 Toughskins
 True Religion (clothing brand)
 Gloria Vanderbilt
 Wrangler (jeans)
 YMI Jeans

References 

Jeans by brand 
Clothing-related lists